In mathematics, or more specifically in spectral theory, the Riesz projector is the projector onto the eigenspace corresponding to a particular eigenvalue of an operator (or, more generally, a projector onto an invariant subspace corresponding to an isolated part of the spectrum). It was introduced by Frigyes Riesz in 1912.

Definition
Let  be a closed linear operator in the Banach space . Let  be  a simple or composite rectifiable contour, which encloses some region  and lies entirely within the resolvent set  of the operator .

Properties

Moreover,

and  have no points in common, then the projectors corresponding to them are mutually orthogonal:

See also
 Spectrum (functional analysis)
 Decomposition of spectrum (functional analysis)
 Spectrum of an operator
 Resolvent formalism
 Operator theory

References 

Spectral theory